Asclepius of Tralles (died c. 560–570) was a student of Ammonius Hermiae.  Two works of his survive:

Commentary on Aristotle's Metaphysics, books I-VII (In Aristotelis metaphysicorum libros Α - Ζ (1 - 7) commentaria, ed. Michael Hayduck, Commentaria in Aristotelem Graeca, VI.2, Berin: Reiner, 1888).
Commentary on Nicomachus' Introduction to Arithmetic (Leonardo  Tarán, Asclepius of Tralles, Commentary to Nicomachus' Introduction to Arithmetic, Transactions of the American Philosophical Society (n.s.), 59: 4. Philadelphia, 1969.

Both works seem to be notes on the lectures conducted by Ammonius.

References
 Martindale, John Robert, The Prosopography of the later Roman Empire, Cambridge University Press, 1994, vol. 3, pp. 135–136. 

6th-century philosophers
Neoplatonists
Commentators on Aristotle
6th-century deaths
Year of birth uncertain
People from Tralles